First Church of Christ, Scientist, built in 1939,  is an historic redbrick Colonial Revival style Christian Science church located at 1100 Washington Road in Mt. Lebanon, Pennsylvania. Its entrance portico is supported by 6 Corinthian columns on the front and 4 on the rear. The steeple is centered behind the portico. Like most Christian Science churches, the focal point of its auditorium is the readers' platform with its double lectern to accommodate the two Readers who conduct the service. It was designed by noted Chicago-based  architect Charles Draper Faulkner, who was renowned for the churches and other buildings that he  designed in the United States and Japan. He designed over 33 Christian Science church buildings and wrote a book called  Christian Science Church Edifices which features this church as well as many others.

In 2002, Mt. Lebanon magazine featured First Church of Christ, Scientist, along with 3 other local churches in an article on Colonial style churches.

First Church of Christ, Scientist, building at 1100 Washington Road in Mt. Lebanon, was sold in July 2018. There are plans to raze the church for a housing development.

See also
 First Church of Christ, Scientist (disambiguation)

References

Resources
 Faulkner, Charles Draper, Christian Science Church Edifices second edition, 1946, Chicago: self-published, has a plot plan on p. 68 and pictures of the church's exterior and interior on pp. 162, 164, 166, 168 and 296.

External links
 Conti, John, God's Own Mansions, Mt. Lebanon magazine, November 2002, pp. 23-27.
 First Church of Christ, Scientist (Mt. Lebanon) website

Christian Science churches in Pennsylvania
Churches in Allegheny County, Pennsylvania
Charles Draper Faulkner church buildings